Francis John Schweihs (February 7, 1932 – July 23, 2008), aka "Frank the German", was an American gangster, who worked for The Outfit, the organized crime family of Chicago. At the time of his death, federal prosecutors planned to indict him for numerous crimes, including murder.  It is believed he had participated in, or had knowledge of, many murders going back decades, including brothers Anthony "Tony the Ant" Spilotro and Michael Spilotro, Allen Dorfman of the Teamsters Union, a disgraced Chicago cop, Outfit associate and informant Dick Cain, Outfit boss Salvatore "Sam," "Mooney" Giancana, loanshark Sam "Mad Sam" DeStefano, Outfit hitman Charles "Chuckie" Nicoletti and others. 

Schweihs had been convicted of extortion in 1989 and was sentenced to 13-years-and-one-month in prison and was ordered to pay $42,900 in fines and restitution.

Schweihs operated with several crews, one of them the "Chinatown Crew" also known as the "26th Street Crew." Its operations were run out of the Old Neighborhood Italian American Club, originally on west 26th Street, in Chicago. Its founder, Angelo J. "The Hook" LaPietra, and Schweihs' partner skimmed $2 Million from Las Vegas casinos in the 1980s and built a new massive club structure on west 31st Street, in Chicago. In 1991, Schweihs collected $12,000 a month from the On Leong, in Chinatown, to allow them to run their casino there. The money was delivered to the Italian Club.

The last known city of residence of Schweihs was Dania Beach, Florida, before he became a fugitive in April 2005. He was a fugitive along with Joseph "Joey the Clown" Lombardo, who each went their separate ways; however, Schweihs was eventually caught in Berea, Kentucky, on December 16, 2005, and less than a month later, Lombardo was caught on January 13, 2006, in the Chicago area. Schweihs' trial was separated from the other defendants' because of his poor health (he had cancer). His co-defendants were convicted in the original trial in 2007. Schweihs remained in jail pending his trial. After his health had been judged to have improved, he was finally scheduled to go on trial in October 2008.

Death
Schweihs died on July 23, 2008, from complications related to his cancer.

Schweihs' daughter, Nora Schweihs, is a castmember of Mob Wives Chicago. She had her father's body exhumed in July 2012 in order to prove the corpse's identity. Schweihs' remains were eventually cremated.

References

External links
Frank Schweihs Mob Article Archive
DOJ Operation Family Secrets press release
New Criminologist: Alleged Mafia hitman Frank "The German" Schweihs arrested in Kentucky  by Nick Morris
Frank Schweihs: Flood Testimony Recalls Breakup Of Mob Hit Attempt, Illinois Police and Sheriff's News
FBI says hit man, 75, kills for mob  by Roberto Santiago

1932 births
2008 deaths
Chicago Outfit mobsters
Mafia hitmen
Deaths from cancer in Illinois
People from Dania Beach, Florida